Johnston's mangabey (Lophocebus johnstoni) is a species of crested mangabey in the family Cercopithecidae.  It had been considered a subspecies of the gray-cheeked mangabey (L. albigena), but was elevated to species Level in 2007, alongside Osman Hill's mangabey (L. osmani) and the Uganda mangabey (L. ugandae).

References

Johnston's mangabey
Primates of Africa
Mammals of the Democratic Republic of the Congo
Mammals of Uganda
Johnston's mangabey
Taxa named by Richard Lydekker